Suguru (written: , ,  or ) is a masculine Japanese given name. Notable people with the name include:

, Japanese footballer
, Japanese fencer
, Japanese baseball player and analyst
, Japanese footballer
, Japanese footballer
, Japanese footballer
, Japanese baseball player
, Japanese bobsledder
, Japanese long-distance runner

Fictional characters
, protagonist of the manga series Kinnikuman
Suguru Kamoshida, an antagonist in the game Persona 5
Suguru Daishō (大将 優), a character from the Haikyu!! series with the position of captain and outside hitter from Nohebi Academy

Japanese masculine given names